Callinicus III, (? – 20 November 1726) was Ecumenical Patriarch of Constantinople for one day in 1726. He is sometimes not counted amongst the patriarchs, and Callinicus IV, who was Patriarch for a short time in 1757, is then numbered as the third of that name.

Life
Callinicus was a native of Naxos and before he was elected as Patriarch of Constantinople he was Metropolitan of Heraclea.

When Jeremy III was deposed on 19 November 1726, Callinicus was elected as Patriarch on the evening of the same day, but he died in the night at his home before the enthronement, possibly from a heart attack due to the happiness at his election.

The appointment fee that he had to pay to the Ottoman Sultan to allow his election was the maximum ever reached: no less than 36,400 Kuruş, about 5,600 gold pounds.  The high amounts of these appointment fees, that the Greek Church could barely afford, were due both to the greed of the Ottoman rulers and to the rivalries and quarrels into the Greek community which led to rapid changes and re-installments of Patriarchs. After the scandal due to a such large amount wasted for a single day reign, the situation slowly improved with longer reigns and lower fees.

Notes

1726 deaths
People from Naxos
Year of birth unknown
18th-century Ecumenical Patriarchs of Constantinople